Mark XIII or Mark 13 often refers to the 13th version of a product, frequently military hardware. "Mark", meaning "model" or "variant", can be abbreviated "Mk." 

Mark XIII or Mark 13 can specifically refer to:

In science
 Kallikrein 13 or mK13, a protein

In technology

In military and weaponry
Mark 13 torpedo, US Navy's most common air-dropped torpedo in World War II
Mk XIII railway gun, a variant of the British BL 9.2-inch railway gun
Supermarine Spitfire PR Mk XIII, lightly armed low-altitude Rolls-Royce Merlin-powered reconnaissance aircraft, first tested March 1943
Vickers Wellington GR Mk XIII, 1944 Coastal Command medium bomber with ordinary nose turret, mast radar and no waist guns
De Havilland Mosquito NF Mk XIII, a night fighter variant of the De Havilland Mosquito that replaced nose guns with radar
Mark 13 nuclear bomb (1951–1954), an American experimental weapon that never entered service
Centurion Mk 13 (1959–1962), a British main battle tank fitted with infrared equipment and a ranging gun
Mk 13 missile launcher, a single-arm guided missile launching system
Mk 13 Mod 0 or EGLM (2004), a 40 mm grenade launcher
MK 13 rifle, a US Military sniper rifle
MK13-class missile boat, a vessel of the Iranian Islamic Revolutionary Guard Corps Navy

Other technologies
Cooper Mk XIII (1959), a Cooper 500 cc rear-engined racing car

Other uses
Mark 13 and Mark XIII, the thirteenth chapter of the Gospel of Mark in the New Testament of the Christian Bible
M.A.R.K. 13, the fictional killer robot in the 1990 film Hardware